LFI may refer to:

Organizations
 Labour Friends of Israel, a lobby group within the British Labour Party
 League for the Fourth International, a Trotskyist international organisation
 Lycée Français d'Irlande, French international school in Dublin, Ireland
 La France Insoumise, a French political party

Other uses
 Limited Feedback Interaction, a recording technique used primarily in the creation of improvised music
 Local File Inclusion, a type of vulnerability most often found on websites
 Logkiy Frontovoi Istrebitel ("Light Frontline Fighter"), a fifth-generation Russian fighter aircraft project
 LFI, IATA airport code for Langley Air Force Base in Virginia
 Learning From Incidents